Eduardo "Lalo" Salamanca is a fictional character in the AMC television series Better Call Saul, which is a prequel to Breaking Bad. Lalo, who was created by Peter Gould and screenwriter Gordon Smith, and is portrayed by Tony Dalton, is introduced in the show's fourth season. Lalo is mentioned in dialogue that introduces Saul Goodman in the Breaking Bad episode "Better Call Saul", though Lalo does not appear in Breaking Bad.

Lalo is one of many nephews of Hector Salamanca, an enforcer of Don Eladio Vuente's drug cartel. After Hector suffers a stroke, Lalo arrives from Mexico to help run the family drug operation in Albuquerque; he takes a greater interest in the day-to-day details of the operation than Hector did. Because of the rivalry between Gus Fring and Hector, Lalo becomes determined to disrupting Gus' legitimate restaurant business and his reputation with the cartel.

Showrunners gave Dalton freedom to diverge from cartel stereotypes and portrayals of the other members of the Salamanca family. Series co-creator Vince Gilligan held himself responsible for delaying Lalo's introduction, which occurred because Gould wanted to introduce Lalo as early as season one. Unlike most other members of his family, Lalo is charismatic and often cheerful; like them, however, he can also be remorselessly vicious. Dalton's portrayal has been critically acclaimed; some critics deemed Lalo to be one of the best villains on television.

Conception and development 
In July 2018, Tony Dalton joined Better Call Saul in the role of Lalo Salamanca, first appearing in the season four episode "Coushatta". The Breaking Bad second-season episode "Better Call Saul" mentions Lalo and also introduces Saul Goodman—Jimmy McGill's business name—and mentions "Ignacio" (Nacho Varga). In an interview before Better Call Saul aired, Vince Gilligan said the writers had envisioned Lalo as a major character and as with Breaking Bad, they must "keep close tabs on what our characters have done in the past and make good use of it here in the present and the future". Gilligan and Peter Gould, however, had difficulty deciding how to properly introduce the character, whom they considered a bogeyman around the second season of Breaking Bad but had not worked out his personality or motivations. Gilligan held himself responsible for delaying Lalo's introduction; Gould had wanted to introduce Lalo as early as season one. Gould realized Lalo needed to be different from the other members of the Salamanca family and a foil equal to Gus Fring. He credited the show's casting directors Sherry Thomas and Sharon Bialy for selecting Dalton for the role, adding Dalton had "the charm, and the joy, and the threat" needed for the character and "all the charm of a '40s movie star". Gould said Lalo was named after the composer Lalo Schifrin.

The episode "Wiedersehen", which was written by Gennifer Hutchison, further develops Lalo. Hutchison said while Lalo is just as "scary" as the other Salamancas, he is "a little more circumspect about things". She said the producers wanted him to be "a little charming", in contrast to the other Salamancas, whom she felt have few qualities beyond fearsomeness. Dalton said the season-five finale "Something Unforgivable" provides a breadth not seen in prior episodes. Lalo first appears as a charismatic person his extended family and cartel leaders welcome but shows a vicious, vengeful side after his family is attacked. Dalton said Lalo's unbridled anger in season six differentiates him from the laid-back personality he displays in season five. Michael Mando, who portrays Nacho, described Lalo as "a Salamanca in every way, just like Tuco and Hector had their own flavors to the erratic Salamancas". Gilligan and Gould gave Dalton freedom to portray Lalo's personality as he saw fit, just as they had allowed Jonathan Banks to develop Mike Ehrmantraut during Breaking Bad, though they told Dalton to think of Lalo as somewhat a "Prince of the Narcos". Dalton considers Lalo to be in juxtaposition to Gus due to Lalo's laid-back attitude and "loose body language" that contrasts with Gus being constantly anxious about decisions and having a "tight body language".

According to Dalton, Lalo was originally not intended to be charming; he felt the series needed someone "kind of smiling and carefree and a little bit mischievous" like Jimmy but "in the bad guy's part". Dalton took inspiration from Samuel L. Jackson's character Jules Winnfield in Pulp Fiction and the negative characters portrayed by Jack Nicholson to create a "[k]ind of this smart ass, sort of scary but kind of carefree, kind of cool guy". Dalton sought to distance himself from his role in the television series Sr. Ávila, in which he played a hitman who he felt had "zero personality". Dalton also took inspiration from Geoffrey Rush's character in Elizabeth who smiles while killing. Dalton toned down Lalo's Mexican accent because of his belief the wealthy character was educated in a "good school" in the United States. He chose for the character an accent he had developed while growing up around Laredo, Texas. Dalton gave Lalo an upbeat personality to show the character's normally easy-going outlook on life and to distance him from typical portrayals of cartel members as serious about their work. Lalo is killed by Gus in the season-six episode "Point and Shoot". Gordon Smith said the writers considered having Mike kill Lalo but this idea was discarded to let the "biggest big bads" in the series—Gus and Lalo—confront each other.

Character biography

Arrival in Albuquerque
Eduardo "Lalo" Salamanca is one of many nephews of Hector Salamanca, an enforcer of Don Eladio Vuente's drug cartel. After Hector suffers a stroke that confines him to a wheelchair and leaves him unable to speak, Lalo moves from Mexico to Albuquerque to help run the Salamanca family's drug operation and takes a greater interest in day-to-day details than Hector did. Nacho Varga, Hector's subordinate, is secretly responsible for Hector's stroke and acts as a mole for Hector's rival Gus Fring, so Lalo's arrival leaves him uneasy. Lalo visits Hector in the nursing home and gives him a front-desk call bell he obtained when Hector killed a hotelier and razed the hotel after its owner disrespected him. Lalo attaches the bell to Hector's wheelchair so Hector can communicate by ringing it with his right index finger, the only body part he can move. Lalo arrives at Los Pollos Hermanos, Gus' restaurant front for his drug operation, and introduces himself to Gus. Lalo thanks Gus for giving Hector first aid and paying for his care but surveils Gus' underlings to learn about their regular activities.

While staking out Gus' chicken farm, Lalo observes activity related to Werner Ziegler's escape. He follows Mike Ehrmantraut as Mike tracks Werner, leading him to a Travelwire store. Mike guesses Werner is going to a hot-springs resort, updates Gus on Werner's actions, and persuades Gus to let him retrieve Werner instead of sending hitmen. After Mike and Gus leave, Lalo enters and tries to learn what Mike knows but the clerk Fred Whalen refuses to tell him. Lalo kills Fred, reviews the security footage Mike saw, and sets fire to the store. Lalo calls resorts until he finds Werner; he then poses as Gus's employee and tricks Werner into revealing details about the construction of a methamphetamine lab under Gus' industrial laundry. Mike arrives at Werner's location and ends the call but realizes Lalo now has information about the construction. Mike reports to Gus, who realizes Werner will have to be killed to prevent Lalo from learning more; Mike accepts responsibility and kills Werner.

Disrupting Gus' business
Gus draws Lalo to a meeting by "stepping on" the Salamancas' share of the cartel's cocaine. With Juan Bolsa present, Gus tells Lalo Werner was constructing a chiller and fled after stealing cocaine. He claims he then attempted to cover for the loss by replacing the cocaine with local, inferior meth. Because the cover story explains events Lalo knows about, he accepts Gus' explanation and apology. Bolsa tells Lalo Gus enjoys Eladio's trust so Lalo should consider the matter closed. Because of Lalo's presence in Albuquerque, Gus stops work on the meth lab. Lalo tells Hector he does not believe Gus' cover story; Hector confirms the cartel tolerates Gus only because he earns well.

When Krazy-8 is arrested outside a Salamanca stash house, Nacho gains Lalo's trust by climbing over rooftops to sneak in and recover the drugs before police enter. Lalo is impressed and takes Nacho into his confidence. Nacho takes Jimmy to Lalo, who knows of Jimmy from Tuco. Lalo asks Jimmy to free Krazy-8 by using him to feed the Drug Enforcement Administration (DEA) information on Gus' dead drops. Nacho informs Gus, who accepts the loss of cash from the dead drops to protect Nacho's role as his informant. Jimmy secures Krazy-8's release and makes him a confidential informant for DEA agent Hank Schrader. Lalo congratulates Jimmy but Nacho warns him once he begins working for drug dealers, there is no turning back.

While posing as a private investigator for Fred's family, Mike persuades a witness to Fred's murder to provide police with details about Lalo's car, leading to Lalo's arrest. In jail under an alias, Lalo is initially denied bail and is suspicious of how the police came to pursue his car, and he instructs Nacho to burn down one of Gus' restaurants. Gus realizes Lalo will continue to be a problem but decides killing him will create tension with the cartel, so Gus and Nacho again protect Nacho's role as Gus' informant by burning down the restaurant. Gus then orchestrates Lalo's release by having Mike provide Jimmy with details of Mike's investigation, which Jimmy uses to accuse police of witness tampering. The judge grants Lalo bail, which is set at $7 million cash.

Lalo's cousins Leonel and Marco deliver the money to Jimmy at a remote desert location. On his return trip, gunmen stop Jimmy, take the cash, and prepare to kill him. Mike was following Jimmy for Gus and kills all but one gunman. They continue the return trip to Albuquerque with the money; when Jimmy's car breaks down, they push it off the side of the road, take the cash, and walk for two days. On the second day, they kill the remaining gunman then continue their journey to Albuquerque.

Jimmy posts Lalo's bail and hides Mike's involvement by claiming he was alone and walked after his car broke down. Mike reports to Gus, who realizes Bolsa sent the gunmen in the belief he was protecting Gus' business by keeping Lalo imprisoned. Lalo prepares to return to Mexico to avoid trial but his suspicions lead him to search for Jimmy's car. Lalo confronts Jimmy and Kim Wexler at her apartment, and reveals he found it and that it had several bullet holes. Kim tells Lalo a passerby probably shot at Jimmy's car for fun and berates him for not trusting Jimmy. Lalo leaves for Mexico with Nacho.

At Lalo's Chihuahua home, friends and family greet him and Nacho. Lalo introduces Nacho to Eladio, who blesses the plan for Nacho to oversee the Salamanca drug business in Lalo's absence. Gus sends assassins to Lalo's home and Nacho receives a call instructing him to leave Lalo's back gate open at 3 am. Lalo is awake at the appointed hour so Nacho sets a kitchen fire to distract him and opens the gate. Nacho flees as the assassins enter and kill most of Lalo's family and guards. Lalo kills the assassins and forces the last one, who is dying, to report his death to the middleman who arranged the attack. Lalo then realizes Nacho is missing and angrily strides away from his house.

War against Gus
Lalo kills a tenant and leaves the body inside his home, causing police and the cartel to assume Lalo is dead. Lalo intends to prove Gus' complicity in the attack but realizes the proof is not in the United States. Gus does not believe Lalo is dead and has Mike arrange for around-the-clock guards. Arriving in Germany, Lalo befriends Werner's widow Margarethe, which leads him to a lucite sculpture given to Werner by his crew. He uses the sculptor's label to locate Casper, whom he disables and coerces into revealing details of the project Werner was supervising.

Lalo returns to Albuquerque and stakes out the laundry, intending to get video footage of the meth lab for Eladio. Seeing the facility is well-guarded, Lalo tricks Gus by calling Hector and claiming he will attack Gus at his home. Mike diverts men to Gus' home, leaving other potential targets unguarded. Lalo then goes to Jimmy and Kim's apartment, where Howard Hamlin is confronting them about their plan to ruin his reputation. Kim implores Howard to leave but Lalo shoots Howard dead.

Lalo instructs Jimmy to go to Gus' home and kill him but Jimmy persuades Lalo to send Kim instead. After Kim leaves, Lalo ties up Jimmy and tells him about the attack on his compound. Jimmy denies involvement and blames Nacho. Lalo leaves for the laundry after threatening to interrogate Jimmy upon his return. Gus realizes sending Kim to his house was a diversion and goes to the laundry. Lalo kills Gus' guards then forces Gus to show him the unfinished lab while he videotapes it. In the lab, Lalo prepares to kill Gus, who cuts power to the lights and kills Lalo with a gun he had hidden earlier. Mike buries Lalo and Howard beneath the floor of the lab, and tells Jimmy and Kim they will not see Lalo again.

Posthumous influence
When Walter White and Jesse Pinkman kidnap Saul to coerce him into representing Badger, who has been arrested for selling meth, a terrified Saul believes Lalo sent them and says, "It wasn't me! it was Ignacio!". Saul is relieved when Walter and Jesse's confusion confirms they have no connection to Lalo. In 2010, Saul is still not entirely convinced Lalo died, calling him "apparently" dead during a phone call with Kim. After being informed by Saul that Mike and Gus are dead, Kim confesses to prosecutors and to Howard's widow, Cheryl. She names Lalo as Howard's killer, but admits to Cheryl that though Cheryl has grounds for a wrongful death lawsuit, Kim will likely not face criminal prosecution because the location of Lalo's and Howard's bodies is unknown.

Reception 
The character Lalo Salamanca and Tony Dalton's performance have received critical acclaim; some critics deemed Lalo one of the best villains on television. Reviewing the episode that introduces Lalo, Alan Sepinwall of Rolling Stone said Dalton "makes a solid first impression in the role" and that he hoped for "more than filling in a blank most viewers had long since forgotten existed". Sepinwall called the final scene in "Bad Choice Road", in which Lalo confronts Jimmy and Kim, one of the best in the series. He praises the lead actors' performances, particularly those of Rhea Seehorn as Kim and Dalton as Lalo. Steve Greene of IndieWire, after comparing Lalo to the character Anton Chigurh in the film No Country for Old Men, noted Lalo has "the unpredictability of his impulsive, petulant brother combined with the faux geniality of his chicken CEO rival" and praised Dalton's performance, whom he says "makes that poisonous, affected smile work, especially when it's coupled with Lalo's blatant disregard for bodily harm". Brian Grubb of Uproxx wrote in his review of the season-five finale, "It is almost unreasonable how good a character Lalo is. To pull this off after five seasons of this show and the full run of Breaking Bad, to just up and introduce someone this charming and evil and perfect, is basically showing off".

References

External links 
 Lalo Salamanca at AMC

Better Call Saul characters
Fictional arsonists
Fictional crime bosses
Fictional drug dealers
Fictional mass murderers
Fictional Mexican people
Fictional murdered people
Fictional thieves
Fictional torturers
Male characters in television
Male villains
Television characters introduced in 2018